Dyke Island (former name Barnards Island) is one of the Falkland Islands, lying between Weddell Island, and West Falkland. The channel running between it and Weddell Island is called Smylie Channel.

References

Islands of the Falkland Islands